Tourism in Laos is governed by a ministry-level government agency, the Lao National Tourism Administration (LNTA).

Statistics

Annual statistics

Notes:
1.COVID-19 pandemic.
2.SARS epidemic
3.September 11 attacks

International visitor arrivals

∗ASEAN nation

See also
 Visa policy of Laos

References

External links

Laos Cultural Profile (Ministry of Information and Culture/Visiting Arts)
The official Laos Tourism Authority site
Laos virtual tour
Laos Tourism Video

 
Laos